Leoš Firkušný was a Czechoslovak musicologist. He was born on July 16, 1905 in Napajedla, Bohemia, Austro-Hungarian Empire. He was an older brother of the famous pianist Rudolf Firkušný, and their sister Marie Kasiková (born Firkušná, October 11, 1909). He was an expert on Leoš Janáček and did much to bring his music to the listeners abroad. He was one of the founders of the music festival Prague Spring. He died on July 9, 1950 in Buenos Aires, Argentina.

Notes

References

External links

1905 births
1950 deaths
People from Napajedla
Czechoslovak musicologists
Czech Jews
Burials at Brno Central Cemetery